Northern Line were a British-based boy band, consisting originally of Lee Baldry, Dan Corsi, Andy Love, Ian Mason and Michael Sharpe with the later additions of Ziggy Lichman and Warren Morris in the line-up changes.

History
The all-male vocal group were signed with Global Talent (Records) Ltd. and released three singles charting in the UK Singles Chart; "Run for Your Life" (#18 in October 1999), "Love on the Northern Line" (#15 in March 2000) and "All Around the World" (#27 in June 2000). Northern Line toured England with Steps in 2000, during Steps' 'Steptacular' tour.

They were managed by David Forecast for ABC Management in London.

Members

Singles discography

References

English boy bands
British pop music groups
Musical groups established in 1998
Musical groups disestablished in 2000